This is a list of Seattle University people, including notable students, alumni, faculty, and administrators associated.

Administration
Administrators who were also alumni are listed in bold font, with degree and year in parentheses.

Presidents
 Walter James Fitzgerald, S.J., President of Seattle College (1929–31)
 Kenneth Baker, S.J., President of Seattle University (1970)
Edmund Ryan, S.J., President of Seattle University (1975–1976)
 Stephen Sundborg, S.J., 21st President of Seattle University (1997–present)
 Eduardo Peñalver, 22nd President of Seattle University effective July 1, 2021

School deans
 Annette Clark (J.D. 1989), 9th Dean of the Seattle University School of Law (2013–present); professor of law

Alumni

Alumni who were also faculty or administrators are listed in bold font, with degree and year. Alumni with a J.D. graduated from the Seattle University School of Law.

Academia
 Albert Ando (BS 1951), professor of economics and finance at the University of Pennsylvania (1967–2002)
 Annette Clark (J.D. 1989), 9th Dean of the Seattle University School of Law (2013–present); professor of law
 Linda N. Hanson (MA, Ed.D.), 19th President (2005–15) and president emerita of Hamline University, former Seattle University administrator
 Richard Labunski (J.D.), professor emeritus of journalism at the University of Kentucky College of Communication & Information
 Charles H. Mitchell (MA 1974), chancellor of Seattle Colleges District (2003–08); president of Seattle Central Community College (1987–2003); NFL player for the Denver Broncos and Buffalo Bills
 Millie Bown Russell (BS 1948), STEM diversity administrator, University of Washington
 Christine Sleeter (MA 1977), professor emerita at California State University, Monterey Bay

Arts and entertainment

 Madeline Ashby (2005), science fiction writer; author of Company Town
 Quincy Jones, (1951, attended), record producer, songwriter, conductor, and arranger
 Carrie Imler, ballet dancer and teacher at Pacific Northwest Ballet
 Fay King, cartoonist, illustrator, and journalist
 Karyna McGlynn, poet, editor, and professor
 Duff McKagan, bassist of Guns N' Roses and Velvet Revolver
 Rose Montoya (BA, 2015), transgender activist and model
 Rebecca Morris (BA), true-crime author and journalist
 Scott Rains (MA), travel writer and disability rights advocate
 Gerri Russell, romantic fiction author
 Christopher Schaap (BA 2014), director, writer, and actor
 Thomas M. Sullivan, Fox Business anchor and Fox News Radio host
 Kaan Tangöze (MS), lead vocalist and guitarist of the Turkish rock band Duman
 Carolyne Wright (BA), poet

Business

 Mohamed Alabbar (BA 1981), founder and Chairman of Emaar Properties, known for large-scale projects such as Burj Khalifa, the tallest building in the world
 Yousef Al-Obaidly, CEO of beIN Media Group
 Chad Anderson (BA), CEO of Space Angels
 Gary Brinson (BA 1966), founder and retired Chairman of Brinson Partners
 Jerry Grundhofer (1965), former CEO and Chairman of U.S. Bank
 S. K. Gupta (MBA), business executive
 Carolyn Kelly (MBA), President and COO of The Seattle Times
 Julie Larson-Green (MS 1992), CXO of Qualtrics, former CXO of Microsoft Office Experience Organization
 Emmanuel Lemelson (BA 1999), Greek Orthodox priest and hedge fund manager
 Carl Otto Løvenskiold (BA 1979), businessperson and heir to the Løvenskiold family of Dano-Norwegian nobility
 Mich Matsudaira (MPA 1977), businessperson and activist; first executive director of the Washington State Commission on Asian Pacific American Affairs
 Stan W. McNaughton (1974), CEO of PEMCO Insurance
 Carol Nelson (1974, MBA 1984), President & CEO of Cascade Bank
 Scott Rains (1991), consultant on inclusive travel
 Calvin Tang (BS 2000), co-founder of Newsvine

Government and politics

 Marzouq Al-Ghanim, Kuwait Speaker of Parliament
 Carl A. Anderson (BA), 13th Supreme Knight of the Knights of Columbus (2000–present); special assistant to President Ronald Reagan
 Andrew Barkis (BA 1990), Washington State Representative (2016–present)
 Dave Barrett, 26th Premier of British Columbia (1972–75); Canadian Parliament Member (1988–93)
 Ann Bartlett, 17th First Lady of Oklahoma (1967–71)
 Martha Choe (MBA), Seattle City Councilmember (1992–99); Washington State Department of Commerce Director (1999–2004); CAO of Gates Foundation (2004–14)
 John E. Cunningham (1958), U.S. Representative from WA-7 (1977–79); Washington State Senator (1975–77); Washington State Representative (1973–75)
 Joe Fain (MBA, J.D.), Washington State Senator from the 47th district (2011–19)
 Fred Jarrett (MBA), Washington State Public Disclosure Commission Member (2019–present); King County Executive Senior Deputy (2010–19); Washington State Senator (2009); Washington State Representative (2001–09)
 Mike Kelly (1960–61; attended), Alaska State Representative (2005–11); Member (1991–99) and President (1996–98) of the University of Alaska system Board of Regents
 Keith Kreiman (BA 1976), Iowa State Senator (2003–11); Iowa State Representative
 August P. Mardesich (attended), Washington State Senator from the 38th district (1963–78) and Majority Leader (1972–75); Washington State Representative (1950–63)
 Rosemary McAuliffe (BS), Washington State Senator from the 1st district (1993–2017)
 Frank Murkowski (BS 1955), 8th Governor of Alaska (2002–06); United States Senator (1981–2002); 3rd Alaska Commissioner of Economic Development (1966–70)
 Mike Murphy (BA 1969), 19th Washington State Treasurer (1997–2009)
 Joe Nguyen (BA 2006), Washington State Senator from the 34th district (2019–present)
 Dino Rossi (1982), Washington State Senator (1997–2003; 2012; 2016–17)
 Rebecca Saldaña (BA), Washington State Senator from the 37th district (2017–present)
 Samuel J. Smith (1951), Washington State Representative (1959–67); Seattle City Councilmember (1967–91), first black person elected to the Seattle City Council
 John Spellman (BA 1949), 18th Governor of Washington (1981–85); 1st Executive of King County (1969–81)
 John Vincent (1970), Montana House of Representatives: Speaker (two terms), Majority Leader, Minority Leader, Majority Whip; Mayor, Bozeman, Montana; Chairman, Gallatin County (MT) Commission; and Member, Montana Public Service (utility) Commission
 Paul Zellinsky (1955), Washington State Representative from the 23rd district (1984–94; 96–98)

Law and justice
 Anne Bremner (J.D. 1982), Seattle lawyer and television legal analyst
 Joe Camacho (MPA), Judge of the Northern Mariana Islands Superior Court (2011–present); Northern Mariana Islands Representative (2007–11)
 Miguel S. Demapan (BS 1975), 3rd Chief Justice of the Supreme Court of the Commonwealth of the Northern Mariana Islands (1999–2011)
 Richard A. Jones (BPA 1972), Judge of the United States District Court for the Western District of Washington (2007–present); Judge of the King County Superior Court (1994–2007)
 Peter Koski (BA 2000), trial attorney
 Charles Swift (J.D. 1994), attorney; United States Navy Lieutenant Commander (ret.)

Military

 Patrick Henry Brady, United States Army Major General (ret.); recipient of the Medal of Honor
 Peter W. Chiarelli (BS 1972), 32nd Vice Chief of Staff of the United States Army (2008–12); United States Army General (ret.)
 Bret D. Daugherty (BS 1980), Adjutant General of Washington State (2012–present); United States Army Major General
 William D. Swenson (2001), United States Army Lieutenant Colonel (ret.); recipient of the Medal of Honor

Science and technology
 John Hopcroft (BS 1961), theoretical computer scientist; 1986 Turing Award co-winner; 1994 ACM Fellow
 Steve McConnell (MS 1991), software engineering expert; author of Code Complete
 Robert Perry, yacht designer known for Tayana 37 and Valiant 40

Theology
 Catherine LaCugna (BA 1968), theologian and University of Notre Dame professor; author of God for Us: The Trinity and Christian Life
 William Meninger, O.C.S.O., Trappist monk known for Centering prayer method
 Francis Schuckardt (BA 1959), founder of the sedevacantist Tridentine Latin Rite Catholic Church
 Dan Schutte, composer of contemporary Catholic liturgical music known for "Here I Am, Lord"

Crime
 Mary Kay Letourneau (1989), teacher who pled guilty to two counts of second-degree rape of a child whom had been her sixth-grade student

Athletes

Baseball

 Eddie O'Brien (1952), Baseball player for Pittsburgh Pirates
 Johnny O'Brien (1952), Baseball player for Pittsburgh Pirates, St. Louis Cardinals and Milwaukee Braves
 Tarik Skubal, Pitcher for Detroit Tigers, 2020–present
 Tanner Swanson (MSAL), New York Yankees quality control coach and catching director

Basketball

 Elgin Baylor (1958), NBA Hall of Famer and general manager; 1958 No. 1 draft pick; Los Angeles Clippers 2006 NBA Executive of the Year
 Rudy D'Amico (1990), NBA basketball scout and former college and professional (Euroleague-winning) basketball coach
 Rod Derline (1974), NBA player for the Seattle SuperSonics
 Eddie Miles (1962), NBA player for the Detroit Pistons
 Johnny O'Brien (1953), 1953 All-American, NBA's Milwaukee Hawks draft pick and the first college player to score 1,000 points in a season
 Jawann Oldham (1979), NBA player for the Chicago Bulls
 Clint Richardson (1978), NBA player for the Philadelphia 76ers
 John Tresvant (1964), NBA player for the Detroit Pistons
 Charlie Williams (1967), ABA player for the Pittsburgh Pipers
 Tom Workman (1967), NBA player for the Baltimore Bullets; 1967 No. 8 draft pick

Soccer
 Melissa Busque (2012), soccer player for CS Fabrose, Seattle Sounders, and Canadian national team
 Jason Cascio (BA 2008), USL soccer player for Seattle Sounders
 John Fishbaugher (BS 2008), USL soccer player for Seattle Sounders
 Sharon McMurtry, U.S. women's national soccer team member (1985–86); played basketball at Seattle University
 Cam Weaver (2005), MLS soccer player for Houston Dynamo FC and San Jose Earthquakes
 Wade Webber (MA), Tacoma Defiance Assistant Coach

Tennis
 Janet Hopps Adkisson (1956), tennis player
 Tom Gorman (1968), ATP tennis player

Other sports
 Ron Howard (1973), NFL player for the Dallas Cowboys, Seattle Seahawks and Buffalo Bills
 John Juanda (MBA 1996), professional poker player; winner of five World Series of Poker bracelets
 Jim Whittaker (1952), mountaineer; first American to summit Mount Everest in 1963

Faculty

 Joaquin Avila, voting rights attorney and activist; directed National Voting Rights Advocacy Initiative at Seattle University School of Law
 Philip Boroughs, S.J., former Jesuit community rector and School of Theology & Ministry faculty member (1989–91)
 Anne Buttimer, OP, geographer; Assistant Professor of Geography (1966–68)
 Marie Cowan, nurse and academic; assistant professor at College of Nursing (1972–79)
 Richard Delgado, professor of law and critical race theory scholar
 Daniel Dombrowski, philosopher and former president of the Metaphysical Society of America; Professor of Philosophy since 1988
 Edward Foley, O.F.M. Cap., visiting faculty at Seattle University Summer Liturgy Institute (2002–06; 2008)
 Robert L. Glass, software engineer; faculty member at Software Engineering graduate program (1982–87)
 Randy Gordon, Washington State Senator from the 41st district (2010); adjunct professor of law since 1999
 Samuel Green, poet and bookbinder; first Poet Laureate of Washington; adjunct Professor
 Gabriella Gutiérrez y Muhs, scholar and former Washington State Arts Commissioner (2014–17); Professor of Modern Languages and Cultures since 2000
 Allison Henrich, mathematician and knot theory scholar; Professor of Mathematics since 2009
 Robert Higgs, economist and economic historian; Professor of Economics (1989–94)
 Burt C. Hopkins, philosopher and Husserl scholar; Professor of Philosophy (1989–2016)
 Nikkita Oliver, attorney and activist; 2017 candidate for Mayor of Seattle; adjunct Professor
 William O'Malley, S.J., theology professor and author; portrayed Father Dyer in The Exorcist
 Dean Spade, lawyer, writer, and trans activist; Associate Professor of Law
 Cyrus Vance Jr., District Attorney of New York County (2010–present); former adjunct Professor of Law

References

Seattle University people
Seattle University